Rebecca Uthup Kizhakkemala is a 2013 Malayalam film directed by Sundardas. It stars Ann Augustine,Siddharth Bharathan,Jishnu Raghavan, Kalabhavan Mani, Sai Kumar in the lead roles.

Cast
Ann Augustine as Rebecca Uthup
Sai Kumar as Uthup (Rebecca's father)
Siddharth Bharathan as Arjun 
Jishnu Raghavan as Kuruvila Kattingal (Rebecca's ex-fiancé) 
Suraj Venjaramoodu as 	Balan
Augustine as Vicar
Kalabhavan Mani as Gabriel, Asst. Vicar
Nikil Jacob as JK
Kalabhavan Shajon as Mathachan
Sasi Kalinga as Raman Nair 
P. Sreekumar as Joseph Kutty
Niyas Backer
Shari as Sosamma
Shanawas as Charlie, Sosamma's brother
Manju Sateesh
Chembil Ashokan as Avarachan

References

External links
 

2010s Malayalam-language films
Films directed by Sundar Das
Indian sports drama films